Sutton Town F.C. was a football club based in Sutton-in-Ashfield, Nottinghamshire, England.

The club competed in the Central Alliance, Midland League, Northern Premier League and Northern Counties East League as Sutton Town before changing its name to Ashfield United in 1992. It disbanded in 1997.

Former players 
 Players that have played/managed in the Football League or any foreign equivalent to this level (i.e. fully professional league).
 Players with full international caps.
 Players that hold a club record.
 Reginald Davies
 Bill Hand
 Trevor Lawless
 Paul Smalley

References

Defunct football clubs in Nottinghamshire
Central Combination
Midland Football League (1889)
Northern Counties East Football League
Northern Premier League clubs
Central Alliance
Association football clubs disestablished in 1997
Association football clubs established in 1886
Sutton-in-Ashfield